HDFC Securities Limited is a financial services intermediary and a subsidiary of HDFC Bank, a private sector bank in India. HDFC securities was founded in the year 2000 and is headquartered in Mumbai with branches across major cities and towns in India.

History
HDFC Securities is the stock broking arm of India’s largest private-sector lender, HDFC Bank, and began operations in April 2000. It began as a joint venture between HDFC Bank Limited, HDFC Limited and Indocean eSecurities Holdings Limited.

Along with its stock broking services, HDFC Securities is a distributor of financial products. In 2006, HDFC Bank bought HDFC Ltd's stake and in 2008 acquired another 4% from Indocean eSecurities. Currently, HDFC Securities is a subsidiary of HDFC Bank.

Management

Bharat Shah - Chairman, HDFC securities Limited 
Dhiraj Relli - Managing Director & CEO, HDFC securities Limited
CV Ganesh - Chief Operating Officer & Chief Financial Officer

Business
HDFC Securities Ltd is a stock broking and distribution arm of the HDFC Group. It is a corporate member of both the Bombay Stock Exchange (BSE) and the National Stock exchange (NSE). In 2019, it entered into a partnership with Stockal, a US-based financial platform and launched GlobalInvesting.in, which allows its customers to directly invest in Nasdaq listed US stocks.

Products and services
 Equities – Investment in stocks of listed companies
 Mutual Funds – Investment in mutual funds including equity, hybrid, tax saving or debt schemes from asset management companies
 SIPs – Systematic investment plan that allows automated investments
 IPOs - Investment in initial public offerings (IPO)
 Derivatives – Hedge or speculate on the price movement of stocks or index through its derivative products viz. Futures and Options
 Bonds, NCDs & Corporate FDs – Investment in fixed income instruments such as bonds, NCDs and Corporate FDs
 ETFs - Investment in exchange-traded funds
 Value Added Services - Provides investing and trading ideas, along with financial tools and calculators, tax solutions, will planning and robot advisors.
 MCX - Investment in bullion, metals, energy and agricultural commodities
 smallcases - Investment in a curated basket of stocks based on a theme or market trend.

In 2021, it introduced a customer tool for chart analysis based on the patterns of various stock movements. The tool is integrated with the HDFC securities mobile app.

Milestones

April 2000: Inception of HDFC Securities. It was a joint venture among HDFC Bank Limited, HDFC Limited and Indocean eSecurities Holdings Limited.
April 2000: Inauguration of the first branch in Mumbai

May 2000: HDFC securities launched its own website

June 2000: Launched stock trading on Bombay Stock Exchange

August 2000: Launched stock trading on National Stock Exchange

November 2000: Introduction of online trading

August 2003: Rolled out online trading in Futures & Options

January 2006: Introduced online IPO/FD system that allowed investors to invest in IPOs and Corporate Fixed Deposits online

March 2008: Pioneered the concept of SIP in equities by launching Do-It-Yourself (DIYSIP) in equities and ETFs

February 2011: One of the first brokerage houses to launch mobile trading app for equity trading

June 2011: Rolled out Futures & Options on mobile trading platform

December 2011: Launched an exclusive mobile trading app for Android phones and Blackberry

March 2012: Launched an exclusive mobile trading app for iPhone

June 2012: Started offering National Pension System

June 2013: Introduced e-filing of Income Tax Return

June 2013: Introduced online mutual fund service that allows customers to invest in mutual fund units through their trading account

July 2013: Took DIYSIP online whereby the investors can invest, track and manage their DIYSIP investments online.

April 2014: Launched an exclusive trading app for iPad

June 2014: Launched next generation trading app for iPhone which facilitates a holistic investment experience

May 2018: Roll out virtual assistant service through voice based IoT devices on Google Home, Google Assistant and Amazon Alexa. One can Open an account, Get Investment Options and invest in stocks and mutual funds with their virtual assistant "Arya"

Awards or recognitions

2010: Runner up in the "Best e-brokerage House" category by Outlook Money

2011: "Largest e-brokerage house" by BSE-Dun & Bradstreet

2013: Runner up in the "Best e-brokerage House" category by Outlook Money

2014: "Best Financial Markets Technology Implementation of the Year" award by The Asian Banker

2014: Zee Business – India's Best Market Analyst Award 2014 under Equity Banking

2016: Runner up in the "Best e-brokerage House" category by Outlook Money

2017: Winner in  "Retail Broking" category by Outlook Money

References

Financial services companies based in Mumbai
HDFC Group
Brokerage firms
Indian companies established in 2000
2000 establishments in Maharashtra
Financial services companies established in 2000